Philine angasi is a species of sea snail, a marine opisthobranch gastropod mollusk in the family Philinidae, the headshield slugs.

References

 Powell A. W. B., New Zealand Mollusca, William Collins Publishers Ltd, Auckland, New Zealand 1979 
 SeaslugForum
 Shell photo

Philinidae
Gastropods of Australia
Gastropods of New Zealand
Gastropods described in 1865